Group A of the 2016 OFC Nations Cup took place from 29 May to 5 June 2016. The group consisted of New Caledonia, hosts Papua New Guinea, Samoa and defending champions Tahiti.

Teams

Notes

Standings

In the semi-finals:
The winners of Group A, Papua New Guinea, advanced to play the runners-up of Group B, Solomon Islands.
The runners-up of Group A, New Caledonia, advanced to play the winners of Group B, New Zealand.

Matches

Papua New Guinea vs New Caledonia

Tahiti vs Samoa

Papua New Guinea vs Tahiti

New Caledonia vs Samoa

Samoa vs Papua New Guinea

Tahiti vs New Caledonia

References

External links
 

Group A
2018 FIFA World Cup qualification (OFC)